Engrossing may refer to:

 Engrossing (law) – marketing offences in English common law
 The process of preparing an engrossed bill in a legislature
 Illuminated manuscript production and design processes

See also
Enrolled bill